Route 89 is a state highway in northeastern Connecticut, running from eastern Mansfield to southern Union. It connects the villages of Mansfield Center, Warrenville, and Westford. It is a two-lane rural collector road throughout its entire length, following the path of the Mount Hope River.

Route description
Route 89 begins at an intersection with Route 195 in the village of Mansfield Center as Warrenville Road and heads north through the northeast portion of the town of Mansfield. Along the way it passes by the north side of Mansfield Hollow Lake then runs parallel to Mount Hope River as it heads into the town of Ashford. Once in Ashford, the road name changes to Mansfield Road until it reaches the village of Warrenville, where it has a junction with U.S. Route 44. Route 89 continues north as Westford Road, still parallel to the Mount Hope River, into the village of Westford. The road turns west on Turnpike Road as it departs the village, then turns north on Ferrence Road towards the town of Union. At the town line, it has an interchange with I-84 (Exit 72). Route 89 ends about  later at an intersection with Route 190 in the southwest corner of Union.

History 
The road connecting Willimantic to Union via Mansfield Center and Westford was designated as State Highway 146 in 1922. In the 1932 state highway renumbering, State Highway 146 was renumbered to Route 89, with a southward extension from Willimantic to Lebanon, ending at modern Route 87. This early Route 89 followed modern Route 289 from Lebanon to Willimantic, then modern Route 195 to Mansfield Center then modern Route 89 to its current end in Union, with the exception of a section north of Westford village that used Waterfall Road instead of Ferrence Road.

In 1942, the Waterfall Road alignment in Ashford was relocated to its current route over Turnpike and Ferrence Roads. In 1964, Route 195 was extended along Route 89 from Mansfield Center to Willimantic. The southern terminus of Route 89 was moved to its current location, with the former section of Route 89 south of the Route 32-Route 66 overlap re-designated as Route 289.

Junction list

References

External links

089
Transportation in Tolland County, Connecticut
Transportation in Windham County, Connecticut